Tom Thill (born 31 March 1990) is a Luxembourgish cyclist, who currently rides for UCI Continental team .

Major results

2003
 1st  Road race, National Cadet Road Championships
2004
 2nd Road race, National Cadet Road Championships
2007
 National Junior Road Championships
1st  Time trial
3rd Road race
 1st  Junior race, National Cyclo-cross Championships
2008
 1st  Time trial, National Junior Road Championships
2009
 2nd Time trial, National Under-23 Road Championships
2010
 National Road Championships
1st  Under-23 time trial
5th Time trial
2011
 National Under-23 Road Championships
2nd Time trial
2nd Road race
 3rd Time trial, Games of the Small States of Europe
2013
 3rd Road race, Games of the Small States of Europe
 National Road Championships
5th Time trial
5th Road race
 9th Ronde Pévéloise
2014
 6th Ronde Pévéloise
2015
 1st  Overall Tour de Hongrie
2016
 5th Circuit de Wallonie
2017
 5th Road race, National Road Championships
2018
 National Road Championships
3rd Time trial
5th Road race
 8th Duo Normand (with Josh Teasdale)
2019
 10th Gemenc Grand Prix I

References

External links

1990 births
Living people
Luxembourgian male cyclists
Sportspeople from Luxembourg City